Nils Jensen Ytteborg (18 September 1792 – 5 June 1858) was a Norwegian craftsman, tanner, businessman, brewer and Member of Parliament in Norway.

Family
Nils Jensen Ytteborg is an only child from a family that originally hailed from the Ytteborg farm in the parish of Løten in Hedmark.

His family migrated to Slagelse, Denmark, while he opted to settle in Christiania (now Oslo) to work as a saddler. He married Ingeborg Marie Woxen (1796–1868) with whom he had two sons, Carl Theodor (1827–1888) and Julius Ferdinand (1830–1910).

Career and Accomplishments
From humble beginning as a saddler and tanner, Ytteborg thrived in his craft, and even expanded his source of income by venturing into selling timber and distillery. When he had accumulated enough capital, in 1836 he founded Ytteborg Brewery, which was later renamed the Foss Brewery.

By 1842, he became one of the richer men in Christiania. His son, Carl Theodor, whom he also trained, later took over the brewery .

On 8 November 1838, he was instrumental in establishing the Christiana Craftsmen Association to protect the rights and welfare of craftsmen and workers in Christiana, including the initiative to professionalize the ranks. His pro-worker initiatives and natural leadership skills had helped in making him as the first craftsman elected as Member of the Norwegian Parliament (1851–1853).

Legacy

In 1958 (100 years after his death) a road in the suburb of Haugenstua in the Oslo district of Stovner was named Garver Ytteborgs vei in memory of him.

References 

1792 births
1858 deaths
Businesspeople from Oslo
Norwegian company founders
Members of the Storting
Norwegian brewers
Politicians from Oslo